Evangelia "Eva" Christodoulou (born 27 September 1983) is a Greek rhythmic gymnast. She won a bronze medal at the 2000 Summer Olympics.

References 

Sports Reference

External links
Christodoulou on databaseolympics.com
Christodoulou on the Embassy of Greece in Washington DC website

Living people
1983 births
Greek rhythmic gymnasts
Gymnasts from Athens
Olympic gymnasts of Greece
Olympic bronze medalists for Greece
Gymnasts at the 2000 Summer Olympics
Olympic medalists in gymnastics
Medalists at the 2000 Summer Olympics